Julian Tufnell Faber (6 April 1917 – 11 January 2002) was a leading figure in the insurance business.

Early life
He was educated at Winchester College and Trinity College, Cambridge. He served with the Welsh Guards during the Second World War.  He retired as a Major.

Career
He joined the family firm of Willis, Faber & Dumas (later Willis Corroon) in 1938 (later rising to chairman). He later served as chairman of Cornhill Insurance and he was responsible for sponsoring English Test Cricket for a long period from 1978.

Family life
He married Caroline Macmillan, a daughter of Harold Macmillan and Lady Dorothy Cavendish, a daughter of the 9th Duke of Devonshire. They had five children:
 1) Anne Cristine Adriane Faber (born 1944). Married firstly in 1970 Michael Roger Lewis Cockerell, two children, married secondly in 1995 The Hon. David Bernstein.
 2) Michael David Tufnell Faber (born 1945). Married Catherine Suzanne de Braine, two children.
 3) Mark James Julian Faber (1950-1991), a Sussex cricketer. Married in 1983 Ann Griffith, three sons.
 4) David James Christian Faber (born 1961), a Conservative politician and an MCC Committee member.
 5) James Edwin Charles Faber (born 1964)

Death and legacy
He died in January 2002, aged 84, and Caroline outlived him.

References

1917 births
2002 deaths
People educated at Winchester College
Alumni of Trinity College, Cambridge
Welsh Guards officers
British Army personnel of World War II
Julian Faber
20th-century English businesspeople